Randi Laubek (born 30 July 1973) is a Danish singer and songwriter. She made her debut in 1997 with Ducks and Drakes, for which she won three Danish Grammy Awards in 1998, including Danish Singer of the Year, Danish Songwriter of the Year, and Danish Album of the Year. In 2001 she again won a Danish Grammy Award for Danish Singer of the Year and was nominated for Danish Songwriter of the Year. Laubek's song Forgotten Anne, written for the video game Forgotton Anne, was nominated for "Original Song - Video Game" at the 9th Hollywood Music in Media Awards.,

Laubek sang duet with Kasper Eistrup on the song The Ghost of No One from Kashmir's 2001 EP Home Dead.

Discography

Albums

Ducks and Drakes, 1997
Almost Gracefully, 2000
The Wedding of All Things, 2003
Figures of Eight, 2005
Sun Quakes, 2009
Letter to the World, 2012
Pow Wow, 2016
Inner Seas Outer Fields, 2016

References

20th-century Danish women singers
1973 births
Living people
21st-century Danish women singers